The Fieseler Fi 157 was an unsuccessful attempt at developing a radio-controlled, full-sized anti-aircraft target.

Design and development
In 1937, the Reichsluftfahrtministerium (RLM) contracted Fieseler to produce a radio controlled anti-aircraft target drone. The resulting Fi 157 was a low-wing monoplane of entirely wooden construction and was carried beneath a bomber before being released. All three prototypes crashed during testing; a single example of a manned version, designated Fi 158, was built to investigate remote guidance.

Specifications (Fieseler Fi 157)

See also

Notes

References

Further reading

External links

 histaviation.com
 wehrmacht-history 

Target drones of Germany
Fi 157
Parasite aircraft
German special-purpose aircraft
Abandoned military aircraft projects of Germany
Single-engined tractor aircraft
Mid-wing aircraft
Aircraft first flown in 1937